The men's 3000 metres steeplechase event at the 1998 Commonwealth Games was held on 17 September on National Stadium, Bukit Jalil.

Results

References

3000
1998